The Roome–Stearns House is a historic building in Portland, Oregon, United States. It is the best and most unaltered remaining example of a modest, cottage-scale Queen Anne house in the Irvington neighborhood, exhibiting elegant Eastlake details on the interior. It was built in 1893 by the Portland Cottage Building Association, a short-lived company that developed several cottage-type homes in the area, leaving its imprint on west Irvington.

The house was entered on the National Register of Historic Places in 1992.

See also
National Register of Historic Places listings in Northeast Portland, Oregon

References

External links

Oregon Historic Sites Database entry

Houses completed in 1893
1893 establishments in Oregon
Houses on the National Register of Historic Places in Portland, Oregon
Irvington, Portland, Oregon
Portland Historic Landmarks
Queen Anne architecture in Oregon